Antonio Giovanni Lanzirotti (9 May 1839 – 1921) was an Italian sculptor.

Biography
He was born in Palermo, where he completes his studies. He then travels to Paris, to work under Joseph Michel Ange Pollet. He was a fierce proponent of Sicilian Independence, and militated under General Ignazio Ribotti in the first grenadiers of Piedmont. His first work was The Education of Bacchus, exhibited at the 1855 World Exposition at Paris. In 1863 he went to Turin, where King Vittorio Emanuele II commissioned statues of the Conte Verde and Duke Vittorio Amedeo I. He sends to Paris, a statue La pensieroso, another La schiava, the first found in London, and the second sold to the museum of Nice. In 1860 he joined the movement of Garibaldi, and was made prisoner at Capo Corso, he was imprisoned for two months at Gaeta, then returned to Paris. There he completed: Amore punito; La Danza; the Mausoleum of Count Tyzhieviez, and a bather which he exhibited at the Salon. Scolpi also sculpted  Il Piacere; and La Follia. He also completed many busts and portraits, including those of Cassagnac, of  M. Girardin, of Doctor Armand Trousseau, of the writer Pierre Beaumarchais, of the King Umberto I. Lanzirotti was named to many Academies, and was awarded the Cross of Knights of Saints Maurizio and Lazzaro, inducted into the Order of the Crown of Italy, and awarded the Order of Isabel the Catholic.

References

1839 births
1921 deaths
Artists from Palermo
19th-century Italian sculptors
Italian male sculptors
20th-century Italian sculptors
20th-century Italian male artists
19th-century Italian male artists